Somsiri Sanath Julien Gunatilake (born 27 October 1955: Sinhala:සනත් ගුණතිලක), popularly as Sanath Gunatilake, is an actor, director, screenwriter in Sri Lankan cinema and film director. A highly versatile actor across many genres, Gunatilake is a veteran actor in the Sri Lankan cinema industry with a career spanning more than four decades. He Served as a member of Western Provincial Council as United National Party member, and later join as media head of President Chandrika Kumaratunga.

Personal life
Gunatilake was born on 27 October 1955, in Mulgampola, Kandy, Sri Lanka, to a middle-class family where his father Hector Gunatilake was a lawyer and mother Grace Goonetileke was a teacher. According to him, his father is a good fan of cinema, and this has influenced him to take part in art at an early age. He was educated at Kingswood College, Kandy and successfully passed GCE O/L, but failed to mark in A/L as he wished to do.

As his first job, he worked as chemistry teacher. Meanwhile, he came to Colombo in search of a new job by quitting his tuition classes in Kandy.

Film career
He made his cinema debut in 1978 in the movie Situ Kumariyo, directed by Vijaya Dharmasiri. However, before the release of his first film, his second film Ganga Addara was screened. Then Sathweni Dawasa was screened. After screening Situ Kumariyo his next film Vajira was screened. The turning point of his success as an actor was his starring role in the movie Ganga Addara, directed by Sumitra Peries. Then his most notable acting came through the role 'Aravinda' in the film Viragaya. For that role, he won Best Actor awards at every film festival in Sri Lanka. Among the high-profile films Sanath has acted in are: Kedapatha, Palama Yata, Doorkada Marawa and Rajya Sevaya Pinisai.

Apart from dramatic role, he made several commercial film appearances along with Vijaya Kumaratunga, Jeewan Kumaratunga and Ranjan Ramanayake in the films Koti Waligaya, Dinuma, Raja Wedakarayo, Nommara 17, Obatai Priye Adare and Inspector Geetha.

Filmography

References

External links 

 
 
 
 මංගල තෑග්ගේ දෙවැනි ගමන

Sri Lankan male film actors
Sri Lankan film directors
Sinhalese male actors
Living people
Kala Keerthi
1955 births